The Low Rainfall Zone (LRZ) is one of three biogeographic zones into which south west Western Australia is divided, the others being the High Rainfall Zone and the Transitional Rainfall Zone. The LRZ is considered marginal to the south west, and extends throughout much of Australia.

The Zones were first defined by Stephen Hopper in his 1979 paper Biogeographical aspects of speciation in the southwest Australian flora. Initially, they were defined in terms of rainfall, with the LRZ being that part of the South West with annual rainfall of less than 300 millimetres (12 in). As the LRZ was marginal to his study area, Hopper did not give a clear demarcation of the zone, merely stating that it

References
 

|!|Rissa|!|

Further reading
 

Biogeography of Western Australia